Linda Peeno is an American physician, ethicist, and lecturer known for being a whistleblower against the American managed healthcare industry.

Whistleblowing
Following employment as a medical reviewer for Humana and medical director at Blue Cross/Blue Shield Health Plans, she became a critic of how U.S. HMOs drive profits through denial of care.

On May 30, 1996, Peeno testified before Congress as to the downside of managed care.

Media representation and controversy 
In the 2002 Showtime docudrama Damaged Care, Laura Dern portrayed Peeno as she transitioned from health care industry employee to whistleblower. In 2007, Peeno was prominently featured in the Michael Moore movie Sicko, which included portions of her May 1996 appearance before Congress.

On June 28, 2007, in a statement about Sicko, Humana declared that Peeno was never a Humana "associate" (permanent, full-time employee), but rather a "part-time contractor". Humana also disputed the portions of Congressional testimony that were shown by saying that because the patient's specific healthcare plan didn't cover heart transplants, the denial of coverage was valid.

References

External links
Toward a Healthier World - Linda Peeno's website
Democracy Now! - HMO Whistleblower Dr. Linda Peeno on the Subordination of Healthcare to a For-Profit System — June 21, 2007
Damaged Care in the New York Times Movie Guide
British Columbia Nurses Union - Damaged Care - Linda Peeno, American whistle-blower doctor warns B.C. of private health care

American whistleblowers
Managed care
Medical controversies in the United States
Physicians from Louisville, Kentucky
Year of birth missing (living people)
Living people
Kentucky women in health professions
American women physicians
21st-century American women